Patrick Kearney (born 1939)  is an American serial killer who preyed on young men in California during the 1970s.

Patrick Kearney may also refer to:

 Patrick J. Kearney, American politician
 Patrick Kearney (guitarist) (born 1970), Canadian-born classical guitarist
 Patrick Kearney (hurler) (born 1987), Irish hurler
 Patrick Kearney (playwright) (1893–1933), American playwright

See also 
 Patrick Kerney (born 1976), former American football defensive end